The 2005–06 season was the 100th season in the existence of Torino F.C. and the club's third consecutive season in the second division of Italian football.

Players

First-team squad
Squad at end of season

Left club during season

Transfers

Pre-season and friendlies

Competitions

Overall record

Serie B

League table

Results summary

Results by round

Matches

Promotion play-offs

Semi-finals

Final

References

Torino F.C. seasons
Torino